The following is a list of commercial short-haul civilian passenger "regional" airliners with significant build numbers. Regional airliners typically seat fewer than 100 passengers and fill the short-hop role in the hub and spoke model of passenger and cargo distribution as well as taking part in point-to-point transit and fly up to 810 miles.

Current in production

Out of production

Historical

See also
 Short haul

Notes

References

Airliners
Civil aircraft
Lists of aircraft by role